Addison Rae Easterling (born October 6, 2000) is an American social media personality and actress. In August 2020, she was ranked as the highest-earning TikTok personality by Forbes. In 2021, Addison Rae made the Forbes 30 Under 30 list for social media influencers.

In 2019, Rae started actively posting content on TikTok, where her dancing videos rose in popularity; as of July 31, 2022, she has amassed over 88 million followers on TikTok, making her the fourth most-followed individual on the platform. In 2021, she released her debut single "Obsessed" and made her acting debut in the Netflix original film He's All That, a gender-swapped remake of the 1999 film She's All That.

Early life 
Addison Rae Easterling was born and raised in Lafayette, Louisiana, to parents Monty Lopez and Sheri Easterling. Rae has two younger brothers, Enzo Lopez and Lucas Lopez, and an older half-sister, Macye Neumeyer, who has 2 daughters of her own. Addison's parents initially divorced when she was younger and were on and off often throughout her childhood before remarrying in 2017. Both parents also have their own presence on TikTok; Monty has 5 million followers and Sheri has 14 million followers.

Rae started dancing competitively at the age of six where she attended competitions across the country. Before moving to Los Angeles to pursue her TikTok career, the dancer briefly attended Louisiana State University (LSU) where she studied sports broadcasting in the fall but then dropped out when she began to gain popularity on TikTok. In an interview with Elle magazine, Addison Rae talks about her choice to move to Los Angeles saying, "a few people in LA reached out to me, and I was like 'I need to go. I need to go.' So my parents supported me fully."

Career 
Addison Rae has 88.5 million followers on TikTok; she first joined TikTok in July 2019, uploading dance videos to trending songs on the platform. She has been part of The Hype House, a TikTok collaborative group, since its formation in December 2019. In just a few months, Rae gained over one million followers on TikTok and decided to leave LSU in November. "I remember that's when it changed for me," Rae told Business Insider in April 2020. "I knew I wanted to take it more seriously and expand it to other platforms. I uploaded a video to YouTube and got really active on Instagram." She signed with talent agency WME in January 2020, along with her parents. In that same month, Addison released a weekly podcast exclusive to Spotify with her mother called "Mama Knows Best" in July 2020 entailing topics covering their personal and career life. In 2021, Rae relaunched this podcast with the new name, "That was Fun? With Addison and Sheri." Addison has launched her own cosmetics line, Item Beauty, with her as the role of Chief Innovation Officer. She co-founded Item Beauty with Madeby Collective, and she oversees most of the products in the brand.

Rae starred in He's All That, a remake film of the 1999 teen comedy She's All That. Her role was inspired by Freddie Prinze Jr.'s character Zachary Siler from the original. The film was released on Netflix in August 2021 and though it was the most streamed film of its week, it received negative reviews from critics. Courtney Howard for Variety magazine wrote that "Rae has a natural ease and charm, at her best when she's either leaning into the bubbly, comedic, satirical overtones, or performing in a heavily choreographed dance-off; however, she's a little rough around the edges and not quite a confident presence when tasked to mine emotional poignancy, especially evident in the third act." Rae subsequently signed a deal with Netflix. On February 2, 2022, Rae announced on Instagram that she had signed to join the cast of a new movie called Fashionista, produced by Paramount, which is currently in the works.Rae was cast in Eli Roth's Thanksgiving on February 23, 2023.

Personal life 
In October 2020, Rae confirmed she was in a relationship with TikToker Bryce Hall through various social media posts; however, they broke up the following year. In January 2021, Rae donated her $1 million in prize money from winning an all-star Mario Tennis Aces tournament called the Stay At Home Slam to the charity No Kid Hungry. In June 2021, Rae began dating Omer Fedi, a musician from Tel Aviv, Israel.

Public image 

Forbes published a report in August 2020 revealing that Rae earned $5 million in the last year through June from her various endorsement deals and merchandise, making her the highest-earning TikTok star. Rae's TikTok success has led her to work with companies such as Reebok, L'Oréal, Hollister and American Eagle. In July 2020, she partnered with American Eagle on the brand's campaign of #AExME Back to School '20 ads as the brand did their first virtual photoshoot that encompasses shots in Addison's bedroom due to the pandemic.

On March 26, 2021, Rae went on Jimmy Fallon’s The Tonight Show. Rae taught Fallon eight viral TikTok dances and was heavily criticized for failing to credit the original creators of the dances. Much of the backlash came from Twitter where people claimed it was an instance of systemic racism as most of the creators of the dances are black. Rae addressed this controversy to TMZ claiming, "I think they were all credited in the original YouTube posting, but it's kind of hard to credit during the show. But they all know that I love them so much and, I mean, I support all of them so much. And hopefully one day we can all meet up and dance together."

In New York City, during the ongoing COVID-19 pandemic, after performing on Fallon's show, Rae wore what appeared to be a handheld glass face shield that fans criticized for not being protective enough for the coronavirus. During a UFC fight in July 2021, Rae got up from her seat to greet former president Donald Trump, leading to speculation that she supported him. Further fueling the speculation, she did not answer questions regarding her support for the former president. An investigation done by BuzzFeed into her liked tweets found that she liked several tweets supporting Trump's 2016 presidential campaign, such as one asking users to "like" the tweet if they supported Trump; however, a representative for Rae claimed that the liked tweets were a bug.

Rae came under further scrutiny in August 2022, when she made a controversial Instagram post featuring a bra and a bikini with the words "Father", "Son" and "Holy Spirit" which was considered blasphemous by many Christians. She has since deleted the post, without making a comment on the matter.

Discography

Filmography

Film

Television

Music videos

Awards and nominations

See also 

 List of most-followed TikTok accounts
 List of most-liked TikTok videos

Notes

References

External links 

 

2000 births
21st-century American dancers
21st-century American women
American female dancers
American TikTokers
American YouTubers
Beauty and makeup YouTubers
Living people
People from Lafayette, Louisiana
Singers from Louisiana
Social media influencers